The NHS Redress Act 2006 (c 44) is an Act of the Parliament of the United Kingdom.

The title of the Act establishes tort based liability as the necessary condition for obtaining redress.

The Act is concerned exclusively with "qualifying liability in tort" and affirms Parliament’s view that fault based liability should remain the basis of compensation for clinical mishaps.

The statute is important legislation since it potentially affects NHS hospital patients; the intention is to extend its operation to primary care. The underlying policy of the Act is to provide a genuine alternative to litigation. The Act does not affect any private law rights. It is wholly concerned with the process of compensation; it does not alter the basis of compensation. It is procedural, not substantive.

The Act proposes a redress package where there has been clinical negligence in hospital. The redress package must include: an offer of compensation, explanation, apology and a report of action to prevent similar occurrences. The redress package may include care or treatment. The package can be accepted with a waiver of the right to sue, or rejected. The redress scheme is to be run by the NHS Litigation Authority.

The proposed redress scheme is a consensual process, not a judicial process; redress is offered not awarded. Proceeding under the redress scheme is voluntary. Proceedings under the redress scheme and civil legal proceedings are mutually exclusive: they cannot be conducted at the same time. Legal rights are suspended but remain intact during the redress process when legal liability is assessed; legal liability is not adjudicated upon by the scheme’s procedure since it does is not a tribunal. Legal rights are only determined if an offer is made and accepted as part of a compromise agreement.

The Act is enabling legislation and the detail of its operation will be set out in regulation. However, indications of its likely operation may be gleaned from Parliamentary debate and in supporting documentation. For example, there are indications that: (1) the scheme proposes that any offer made will be without prejudice, so that if it is rejected it may not be taken as evidence of liability in any legal proceedings; (2) the upper limit for monetary compensation will be £20,000; (3) legal privilege will not be asserted in respect of the investigation report.

References
Clinical Negligence, edited by Powers Harris Barton, fourth edition 2008, Tottel Publishing; 

United Kingdom Acts of Parliament 2006
NHS legislation